Lyman Smith (born September 24, 1956) is a former American football defensive tackle. He played for the Minnesota Vikings in 1978.

References

1956 births
Living people
Players of American football from Portland, Oregon
American football defensive tackles
Duke Blue Devils football players
Minnesota Vikings players